The Terrorism Act No 83 of 1967 was a law of the South African Apartheid regime until all except section 7 was repealed under the Internal Security and Intimidation Amendment Act 138 of 1991.

Detention without trial
Section 6 of the Act allowed someone suspected of involvement in terrorism—which was very broadly defined as anything that might "endanger the maintenance of law and order"—to be detained for a 60-day period (which could be renewed) without trial on the authority of a senior police officer. Since there was no requirement to release information on who was being held, people subject to the Act tended to disappear.

The death of Steve Biko in police custody in 1977, while being detained under the Act, was a particular cause célèbre. It is estimated that approximately 80 people died while being detained under the Act.

Other provisions
Other provisions of the Act included the founding of the Bureau of State Security.

References

External links

Legislating Against Terrorism in South Africa
Judge Navantheen Pillay interview transcript

Apartheid laws in South Africa
Terrorism in South Africa
Terrorism laws
1967 in South African law
Steve Biko affair